The Clergy Reserves in Canada Act 1840 is the short-title of An Act to provide for the Sale of the Clergy Reserves in the Province of Canada, and for the Distribution of the Proceeds thereof, passed at Westminster in the 3-4th year of Queen Victoria.

The Legislative Assembly of Upper Canada had passed a law to sell the reserves in 1840, but it was disallowed and displaced by this Act. Although considered to be more favourable to the Anglican Church of Canada, this Act as passed provided that only one-half of future sales would be dedicated on a 2:1 basis to the Anglican Church and the Church of Scotland, with the remaining moiety being distributed to all other churches according to their respective strengths. The administration of the reserve lands was transferred to the Crown Lands Department, where it was handled in a less contentious manner.

References

Statutes

Bibliography
 
 
 

United Kingdom Acts of Parliament 1840
Acts of the Parliament of the United Kingdom concerning Canada
Province of Canada legislation
Constitution of Canada
British Empire
Westminster system
1840 in Canada
Legal history of Canada
1840 in British law